Peter James Benjamin "Pat" Murphy (circa 1878 – circa 1945) was a rugby union player who represented Australia.

His brother William was also an Australian rugby union representative player.

References

                   

Australian rugby union players
Australia international rugby union players
Year of birth uncertain
Rugby union locks